State Road 349 (SR 349) is a two-lane state highway in eastern Dixie and Lafayette counties, near the Suwannee River. Near Fletcher, it intersects County Road 351 (CR 351), a major access road to Cross City and Horseshoe Beach. The northern terminus at the intersection of U.S. Highway 27 (US 27) in Grady, which is on the west side of the Suwannee River near Branford. The southern terminus of SR 349 is at an intersection of US 19/US 27 Alternate/US 98 in Old Town, although it extends southward to Suwannee as CR 349.

History
SR 349 was part of US 129 from 1948 to 1959, and US 129 Alternate from 1959 to 1970.

Major intersections

References

External links

Florida Route Log (SR 349)

349
349
349
349
U.S. Route 129